is a Japanese actress best known for her performances in One Missed Call and Battle Royale.

Filmography

Movies

TV action

References

External links
 Anna Nagata's website

Japanese actresses
Japanese female models
Japanese television personalities
Living people
1982 births
Former Stardust Promotion artists
Models from Tokyo Metropolis